The Zhengbin Fishing Port is a fishing port located in Zhongzheng District, Keelung, Taiwan.

History
Built by the Japanese in 1934, the port used to be the largest fishing port in Taiwan and the main export port of Jinguashi copper mine during the Japanese colonial period. No longer the bustling center of its past, nowadays the pace of life is much slower in this corner of the city. However, Zhengbin Fishing Port is now popular amongst both locals and tourists for its row of 16 multi-colored houses situated on the bank. The port is located a five-minute walking distance away from the Keelung City Indigenous Cultural Hall.

Transportation
The port is accessible via multiple bus routes, e.g. Keelung bus 101 to Zhengbin Rd. bus stop as well as buses 103 and 104 to Zhongzheng District Health Center bus stop.

See also
 Fisheries Agency
 Badouzi Fishing Port
 Bisha Fishing Port

References

Ports and harbors of Keelung